= Las Esquinas =

Coordinates: 28°44′13″S 65°06′29″W

- Municipality and village
- Interactive map of Las Esquinas
- Country: Argentina
- Province: Catamarca Province
- Time zone: UTC−3 (ART)

Las Esquinas is a village and municipality in Catamarca Province in northwestern Argentina.
